Gephyromantis cornutus, commonly known as the Horned Madagascar Frog, is a species of frog in the family Mantellidae.  It is endemic to Madagascar.  Its natural habitats are subtropical or tropical moist lowland forests, subtropical or tropical moist montane forests, and rivers.  It is threatened by habitat loss.

References

cornutus
Endemic fauna of Madagascar
Taxonomy articles created by Polbot
Amphibians described in 1992